KDU-ČSL (In Czech, the initials of the Christian and Democratic Union – Czechoslovak People's Party), often shortened to  ('the populars'), is a Christian-democratic political party in the Czech Republic. The party has taken part in almost every Czech government since 1990. In the June 2006 legislative election, the party won 7.2% of the vote and 13 out of 200 seats; but in the 2010 election, its vote share dropped to 4.4% and they lost all of its seats. The party regained its parliamentary standing in the 2013 legislative election, winning 14 seats in the new parliament, thereby becoming the first party ever to return to the Chamber of Deputies after previously dropping out.

History
Towards the end of the 19th century Roman Catholics in Bohemia and Moravia joined political movements inside Cisleithanian Austria-Hungary. The Christian-Social Party was set up in September 1894 in Litomyšl, and the Catholic National Party in Moravia was set up in September 1896 in Přerov.

Československá strana lidová (ČSL) was created in January 1919 in Prague, reuniting other Catholic parties, and Jan Šrámek was selected as its chairman. In 1921, ČSL entered the government of Czechoslovakia, and was subsequently part of governing coalitions regardless of political changes.

After the German occupation of Czechoslovakia, Šrámek served as head of Czechoslovak government in exile (in the United Kingdom). After 1945, ČSL was part of the national unity government, forming its most right-wing section. When the Communist Party of Czechoslovakia took over all power in February 1948, many ČSL officials were imprisoned. The party lost any real influence and was kept as a de facto puppet of Moscow-aligned communists (see National Front). In turn, it was allowed to keep a token presence of ČSL in government until 1989.

After the Velvet Revolution in 1989 ČSL attempted to shed its compromised figures and policies of the past: this included a change of name in 1992 after the merger with the Christian and Democratic Union (which was a post-revolution attempt at more modern political Catholicism trying to emulate the German CDU, but lacking the strength of its traditional counterpart). KDU-ČSL was part of the governments of Václav Klaus's Civic Democratic Party (ODS) until its ministers left in autumn 1997 which triggered the government's fall; KDU-ČSL was also represented in the caretaker government of Josef Tošovský before the premature elections in 1998.

In June 2002 KDU–ČSL went into the elections on a joint ballot with the Freedom Union–Democratic Union (US–DEU) as the "Two-Coalition", which was the last remnant of an unsuccessful attempt to unite them with three smaller parties into the "Four-Coalition" which would provide an alternative to the practices of the "opposition agreement" of ODS and Czech Social Democratic Party (ČSSD). However it turned out that the KDU–ČSL's traditional voters identified much more strongly with their original party than the whole, unlike US–DEU's liberal city ones, and using preferential votes on evenly split ballots caused that KDU–ČSL gained 22 MPs to US–DEU's 9 even though both parties were of roughly equal strength. They entered the government again by forming a coalition with the winning Czech Social Democratic Party.

In 2003 Miroslav Kalousek was elected chairman; unlike his predecessor Cyril Svoboda he represents the right wing of KDU–ČSL favouring cooperation with ODS, which was a source of tension within the coalition. He refused to enter the government both after his election and the government's reconstruction after PM Vladimír Špidla's resignation, and finally on 19 February 2005 asked for the resignation of PM Stanislav Gross after his finance scandal broke out. Gross retaliated by threatening to remove KDU–ČSL from his cabinet; a government crisis ensued.

After the 2006 legislative elections and lengthy negotiations caused by stalemated result, the KDU–ČSL formed a government together with the ODS and the Green Party (SZ).

Cyril Svoboda became the party chairman on 30 May 2009. In reaction to his election, his predecessor Miroslav Kalousek led a split from the party to form TOP 09, as he considered Svoboda to be too far on the left wing of the party. In the 2010 Chamber of Deputies election, the party's vote dropped to 4.39%, and they lost every one of their seats to other parties. Svoboda resigned as a consequence of the results. In November Pavel Bělobrádek was elected on his stead. The Party returned to the Parliament after 2013 election, becoming the so far only party in the history of Czech republic to achieve a return after defeat in elections. On 12 April 2017, KDU-ČSL signed an agreement with STAN to participate in 2017 legislative election as a coalition. Coalition needed to get more 10% of votes get over threshold. The coalition disintegrated before the election, thus the party went into the elections standalone, receiving 5.8% of votes.

In March 2019 the party was officially renamed to KDU-ČSL, its common abbreviation and Marek Výborný became a new party leader. After the death of his wife announced Marek Výborný in November 2019 his resignation for personal reasons.

Tomáš Zdechovský, Jan Bartošek and Marian Jurečka decided then to run for party leader.

Current situation
KDU–ČSL has a relatively small but stable core voter base of about 6 to 10 percent of the population. It is strongest in the traditionally Catholic rural areas in Moravia. Historically, it was a mass party with about 50,000 members (second after the Communist Party of Bohemia and Moravia), however today most of them are of old age. Efforts to recruit new voters have been largely unsuccessful, with party membership continuing to decline. Nevertheless, KDU–ČSL has managed to take advantage of the fragmented Czech political party system and make itself a necessary part of any coalition, whether the winning party be left- or right-wing.

In the European Union, KDU–ČSL is a member of the European People's Party (EPP).

Internal Structure

Membership
KDU-ČSL had 27,662 Members in 2015 which is the second largest member base of any party in the Czech Republic. The number is decreasing 1990s when the party had 100,000 Members, It is caused by high average age of members.

Party strongholds
KDU-ČSL is known to have very strong electoral core concentrated primarily in South Moravia. The party has very stable electoral support thanks to the rural voters in Moravia and has managed to gain seats in Chamber of Deputies during every election cycle  in Czech since 1990 with the exception of 2010

Partners
Notable partners and suborganisations of the KDU-ČSL are:

Young Populars - youth organisation
KDU-ČSL Women Association - women's wing
Institute for Christian Democratic Politics - think-tank 
Economic and entrepreneurial union of KDU-ČSL - entrepreneurs' wing 
European Academy for Democracy - think-tank.
Institute of Political and Economical Studies - think-tank
European People's Party - European party
Centrist Democrat International - political international

Leaders

Jan Šrámek (1922-1948)
Alois Petr  (1948–1951)
Josef Plojhar (1951–1968)
Antonín Pospíšil (1968–1973)
Rostislav Petera (1973–1980)
František Toman (1980–1981)
Zbyněk Žalman (1981–1989)
Josef Bartončík (1989–1990)
Josef Lux (1990–1998)

Jan Kasal (1999–2001)
Cyril Svoboda (2001–2003)
Miroslav Kalousek (2003–2006)
Jan Kasal (2006)
Jiří Čunek (2006–2009)
Cyril Svoboda (2009–2010)
Michaela Šojdrová (2010)
Pavel Bělobrádek (2010–2019)
Marek Výborný (2019–2020)
Marian Jurečka (Since 2020)

Symbols

The party's patron saint is Saint Wenceslaus, with Saint Wenceslas Chorale being played at party congresses. Members customarily address each other as brothers and sisters.

KDU-ČSL has had many symbols through history, with the current logo depicting a Christian cross on a linden leaf.

Logos

Name of the party over time
1919–1992 The Czechoslovak People's Party (Československá strana lidová) – merger of Moravian-Silesian Christian Social Party in Moravia, Catholic-National Conservative Party in Moravia, Czech Christian Social Party in the Kingdom of Bohemia and Catholic-National Conservative Party in Bohemia, Conservative People's Party.
1992–2019 The Christian and Democratic Union – Czechoslovak People's Party (Křesťanská a demokratická unie – Československá strana lidová)
Since 2019 KDU-ČSL - after renaming to party' abbreviation.

Election results

Czechoslovakia wide elections

Legislative elections

Devolved assembly elections

Czech assembly elections

Slovak assembly elections

Czech Republic wide elections

Legislative elections

Senate elections

* Places are by number of votes gained.
** The whole Senate was elected. Only one third of Senate was elected in all subsequent elections.
***Participated as Part of Four-Coalition

Presidential

European Parliament

Local elections

Regional elections

2020 Czech regional election results

Further reading

Notes

References

External links

Czech
Official website

English
English version of the homepage

 
Catholic political parties
Christian democratic parties in the Czech Republic
Political parties in Czechoslovakia
Social conservative parties in the Czech Republic
1919 establishments in Czechoslovakia
Political parties established in 1919
Member parties of the European People's Party
Centrist political parties in the Czech Republic
Regionalist parties in the Czech Republic
Pro-European political parties in the Czech Republic